Scooter LaForge (born 1971) is an American artist based in New York's East Village. He is a painter and sculptor, and has a line of clothing for Patricia Field and has collaborated with other fashion designers. LaForge's work is "inspired by gay pornography, cute fluffy animals, and sometimes iconic cartoons," drawing from a number of pop culture and artistic references, ranging from Disney and Popeye to Keith Haring and Rembrandt.

The New York Times has described his work as "recalling the Neo-Expressionism that was popular in the '80s, the manic Neo-Surrealism of George Condo, and the comics-to-graffiti-to-canvas style of Kenny Scharf." Pop culture journalist Michael Musto has called him "my favorite living artist".

Early life
LaForge was born James Edward LaForge in 1971 in Las Cruces, New Mexico.

Work
LaForge earned his BFA from the University of Arizona in 1993, and began his career as a painter in San Francisco. He moved to New York City in 2001, where he attended the Cooper Union School of Art under a fellowship. His art is in the collections of the Leslie-Lohman Museum of Art and Beth Rudin DeWoody.

LaForge has a line of hand-painted, unique clothing items that are sold through fashion stylist Patricia Field. He has twice collaborated with Belgian fashion designer Walter Van Beirendonck. His clothing has been worn by
Susanne Bartsch,
Sandra Bernhard,
Beyoncé,
Miley Cyrus,
Boy George,
Debbie Harry,
Nicki Minaj,
Madonna,
Iggy Pop,
Rihanna, and
Lil Wayne.

Exhibitions

Solo
 2002 – Suicidal Tendencies, Build, San Francisco
 2003 – No Sleep till Brooklyn, Landing, Brooklyn
 2004 – Magic, San Angel Folk Art Gallery, San Antonio
 2005 – Combines, 12 Little West 12th Street Gallery, New York
 2007 – Land of Enchantment, Kanvas Gallery, New York
 2009
 Destroy All Monsters, Live Fast, New York
 Nature's Clown, Envoy Enterprises, New York
 New York Monster, Envoy Enterprises, New York
 New Paintings, La Petite Mort Gallery, Ottawa
 2012 – Super Powers and Special Abilities, Munch Gallery, New York
 2013 – Summer Love, Deluca Gallery, Provincetown
 2015
 Travels with Johnny, Munch Gallery, New York
 New Paintings, Galerie MX, Montreal
 How to Create a Monsterpiece, Howl! Happening, New York
 2016 – Everything's Going to Be OK, Theodore Art, Brooklyn
 2017 – The Odyssey, Jealous Gallery, London
 2019
 Creation of the Animals, Empirical Nonsense, New York
 Homo Eruptus, Howl! Happening, New York

Group
 2000 – Confess, Southern Exposure, San Francisco
 2001 – Frenzy, The Luggage Store Gallery, San Francisco
 2004 – Reactions, Exit Art, New York
 2005
 4 x 4, Gallery Artopia, Albuquerque
 Wooster Projects, New York
 2006
 Portraits for Marc Jacobs windows, New York
 Cooper Union Group Show, New York
 Scope Hampton, Stephanie Theodore, New York
 2007
 Remember Jerome, Bucheon Gallery, San Francisco
 The Comic Uncanny, Shaheen Modern & Contemporary, Cleveland
 2009
 The Thin Veil, Antebellum Gallery, Los Angeles
 Out of Order, Andrew Edlin Gallery, New York
 2010
 The Salacious Salon Pool Art Fair, Gershwin Hotel, New York
 Gasoline Rainbow, CS13, Cincinnati
 I See Myself in You, Bronx Art Space, Bronx
 Lingering Whispers, Crypt Gallery at St. Pancras Church, London
 Power to the People, Feature, Inc., New York
 Tom of Finland and Then Some, Feature, Inc., New York
 The London Biennale, Christopher Henry Gallery, New York
 2011
 Wolfpack!, Splatterpool Artspace, Brooklyn
 Queer from Zero to a Hundred, theater for the New City Gallery, New York
 B-B-B-Bad, Anna Kustera Gallery, New York
 Tattoo You, Munch Gallery, New York
 Dirty Show, City Center Motel, Los Angeles
 I Am Not Monogamous, I Heart Poetry/Feature, Inc., New York
 2012
 Flesh Garden, YESSR4, Buenos Aries
 Fountain Art Fair, Munch Gallery, New York
 Scooter LaForge/Christopher Moss, Theodore Art, Brooklyn
 Wolfpack: Manhattan to Manchester, Cube Gallery, Manchester
 2013 – Downtown New York, Broome Street Gallery, New York
 2014
 Boys Keep Swinging, Summerhall, Edinburgh
 Bibbidi-Bibbidi-Boo, Here Arts Center, New York
 Flesh Garden, La Petite Mort Gallery, Amsterdam
 Mad Maus, Gallery Hotel Particulier, New York
 Watermill Center Benefit Auction, Watermill
 Queer Biennial, Coagula Curatorial, Los Angeles
 NEWD Art Fair, Bushwick, Bushwick
 SummerShow2014, Munch Gallery, New York
 2015
 Interface, Leslie-Lohman Museum, New York
 Powerful Babies, Spritmuseum, Stockholm
 Drawings, Theodore Art, Brooklyn
 2019
 ICYMI, Theodore Art, Brooklyn
 Stonewall 50/50, 1969 Gallery, New York
 Pride, Postmasters Gallery, New York
 2020 – Dogs and Bones, Theodore Art, Brooklyn

References

External links
 
 

1971 births
21st-century American painters
21st-century American sculptors
American male painters
American male sculptors
Living people
Painters from New York City
People from Las Cruces, New Mexico
Sculptors from New York (state)
University of Arizona alumni